Wilkesdale is a rural locality in the South Burnett Region, Queensland, Australia.

Divine Truth new religious movement is based here, after Alan John Miller purchased a property here in 2007.

Road infrastructure
The Chinchilla Wondai Road (State Route 82) runs through from west to east.

References 

South Burnett Region
Localities in Queensland